Henry Casson Barnes Bazely (1842–1883) was a non-conformist minister of the Church of Scotland operating in Oxford and London.

Life

He was born on 8 September 1842 the only son of Rev Thomas Tyssen Bazely (1808-1894) rector of All Saints Church in Poplar, London, and his wife Julia Shipdem (d.1876). His paternal grandfather was Admiral John Bazely (1740-1809). On his father's retiral (sometime before 1861) the family moved to 1 James Villas, Poonah Place, Tunbridge Wells.

Henry was educated at Radley College under Dr Sewell then obtained a place at Oxford University where he graduated BA in 1865 and BCL in 1868. While at Brasenose College in Oxford he befriended Rev David Johnston of Unst. They travelled togehther to Scotland where Johnston explained the Scottish system of worship. This friendship caused him to leave the Church of England and join the Church of Scotland in 1868. 

In 1869 he was licensed to preach as a Church of Scotland by the Presbytery of Edinburgh. On his return to Oxford he then began preaching in the open in Oxford, especially to the poor, and selling his possessions to help the poor. His favourite spot to preach was the Martyr's Memorial in Oxford.

In 1871 he hired a meeting hall on Alfred Street in Oxford (at his own expense) where he began preaching in the Church of Scotland format. In April 1877 he was formally ordained as a Church of Scotland minister in Stepney in London (the church had no premises in Oxford).

In 1876 he received an inheritance on the death of his mother. He used the entire amount plus some of his own funds to personally finance the first Church of Scotland Church in Oxford, which he built on a site on Nelson Street, being completed in 1879.

He preached at race meetings at both Abingdon-on-Thames and Ascot and continued to preach each evening at the Martyrs Memorial.

In 1881 he was living with his new wife at 32 New Inn Hall Street in Oxford.

He died of Bright's disease at home in Oxford on 1 March 1883 and is buried in St Sephulcre Cemetery in Oxford.

After Bazely's death there was a dispute between the Church of Scotland and his widow as to the ownership of the church on Nelson Street. The Church offered no compensation and Mrs Bazely was in dire need of funds and could not give the building away. As such, the Church of Scotland abandoned its presence in Oxford in 1885.

Family
On 6 August 1880 in a crown court in London he married Louisa Boothby (1856-1918), daughter of George William Boothby RN.

They had one son, George Henry Boothby Bazely (b.1881)

References
 

1842 births
1883 deaths
Alumni of the University of Oxford
People from Oxford
English philanthropists